Aleksandr Borisov may refer to:

 Aleksandr Borisov (actor) (1905–1982), Soviet actor
 Aleksandr Borisov (painter) (1866–1934), Russian painter
 Aleksandr Borisov (politician) (born 1974), Russian politician

See also
 Borisov (disambiguation)